The Gregor-Mendel-Gymnasium (GMG, Gregor Mendel High School) is a national, public gymnasium in Amberg, Bavaria, Germany. It is named after the scientist Gregor Mendel. As of 2006 it has some 950 students, of whom 35% are from the city of Amberg, and 65% from the surrounding district. There are some 60 instructors.

The school was founded in 1833 as the Königliche Landwirtschafts- und Gewerbeschule.

Alumni 
Noteworth alumni include:
Eugen Oker (1919–2006), writer
H. E. Erwin Walther (1920–1995), composer
Johann Baptist Metz (*1928), professor of theology
Eckhard Henscheid (*1941), writer

Educational institutions established in 1833
Gymnasiums in Germany
Schools in Bavaria
1833 establishments in Germany